Crotonogyne is a shrub of the spurge family (Euphorbiaceae) first described as a genus in 1864. It is native to western and central Africa. It is dioecious.

Species

Formerly included
moved to other genera: Cyrtogonone 
Crotonogyne argentea  - Cyrtogonone argentea

References

Aleuritideae
Euphorbiaceae genera
Flora of Africa
Dioecious plants